Bihu Songs of Assam is a book authored by Prafulladutta Goswamil, and published by Lawyers Book Stall in 1957. The book is a collection of 262 Bihu songs collected as early as 1921, which were first put into print in 1934. Although the songs are in English, each song is later shown in original Assamese text.

References

External links
Book Profile on Bibliopolis
 
 Assamese Bihu Mp3 Songs Download

 Book profile on alibris

1957 books
Indian songs
Assamese literature
Books from Assam
Indian poetry collections